Sayyad 4B is a 300-kilometer-range missile that is compatible with Iran's indigenous Bavar-373 air defense system. Sayyad 4B is the latest in the Sayyad series of solid-fuel missiles.

Sayyad 4B allows for the extension of the air defense system missiles up to 300 km and an increase in the engagement altitude from 27 to 32 km. The detection radar of Bavar 373 has a range that has increased from 350 to 450 km, while its tracking range has increased from 260 to 400 km. The Bavar-373 made its debut in August 2019. The long-range air defense system of Iran is able to simultaneously engage with six targets while tracking 60 other targets.
The maximum altitude of the missile has reportedly increased from 27 to 32 km.

Although it is being marketed as an export item under the name AD-200, the Iranian military has not yet announced that the system has entered service. The Sayyad-4 missile uses active or semi-active radar homing in the terminal phase. Talaash air defense system is designed to fire the Sayyad-2 and Sayyad-3, but Sayyad-4 is based on Bavar-373 air defense system.

See also
Mersad
Raad Air Defense System
Sayyad missile family
Ya Zahra air defense system

References

External link
video of  Sayyad-4 launch

21st-century surface-to-air missiles
Surface-to-air missiles of Iran
Guided missiles of Iran
Military equipment introduced in the 2010s